Cape Fie (Norwegian: Kapp Fie), located at , is a cape marking the southeast extremity of Bouvetøya  in the South Atlantic Ocean. It was first roughly charted in 1898 by a German expedition under Carl Chun, and was re-charted and named by the Norwegian expedition under Captain Harald Horntvedt who explored the area from the Norvegia in December 1927.

See also 
Williams Reef

References 

Headlands of Bouvet Island